Blue Cross Blue Shield Association (BCBS, BCBSA) is a federation, or supraorganization, of, in 2022, 34 independent and locally operated BCBSA companies that provide health insurance in the United States to more than 115 million people. It was formed in 1982 from the merger of its two namesake organizations: Blue Cross was founded in 1929 and became the Blue Cross Association in 1960, while Blue Shield emerged in 1939 and the Blue Shield Association was created in 1948.

Commonly called "The Blues" within the healthcare insurance industry, the organization has two offices, one in Chicago and one in Washington, D.C. The main office is in Chicago in the Illinois Center at 225 North Michigan Avenue. The BCBSA claims to control access to the Blue Cross and Blue Shield trademarks and names across the United States and in more than 170 other countries, which it then licenses to the affiliated companies for specific, exclusive geographic service areas. It has affiliated plans in all 50 states, the District of Columbia, and Puerto Rico, as well as licensees offering plans in several foreign countries; it also participates in the nationwide health insurance program for employees of the United States federal government. The BCBSA manages communications between its members and the operating policies required to be a licensee of the trademarks. This permits each BCBSA company to offer nationwide insurance coverage even though it operates only in its designated service area.

History 

Blue Cross and Blue Shield developed separately, with Blue Cross providing coverage for hospital services and Blue Shield covering physicians' services.

Blue Cross is a name used by an association of health insurance plans throughout the United States. Its predecessor was developed by Justin Ford Kimball in 1929, while he was vice president of Baylor University's health care facilities in Dallas, Texas.  The first plan guaranteed teachers 21 days of hospital care for $6 a year, and was later extended to other employee groups in Dallas, and then nationally. The American Hospital Association (AHA) adopted the Blue Cross symbol in 1939 as the emblem for plans meeting certain standards. In 1960, the AHA commission was superseded by the Blue Cross Association. Blue Cross severed its ties with the AHA in 1972.

Blue Shield  was developed by employers in lumber and mining camps of the Pacific Northwest to provide medical care by paying monthly fees to medical service bureaus composed of groups of physicians.  In 1939, the first official Blue Shield plan was founded in California. In 1948, the symbol was informally adopted by nine plans called the Associated Medical Care Plan, and was later renamed the National Association of Blue Shield Plans.

In the 1960s, the U.S. government chose to partner with Blue Cross and Blue Shield companies to administer Medicare.
 
In 1982, Blue Shield merged with The Blue Cross Association to form the Blue Cross and Blue Shield Association (BCBS).

Prior to 1986, organizations administering BCBS were tax exempt under 501(c)(4) as social welfare plans. However, the Tax Reform Act of 1986 revoked the exemption, because the plans sold commercial-type insurance. They became 501(m) organizations, subject to federal taxation, but entitled to "special tax benefits" under IRC 833.

In 1994, BCBS changed to allow its licensees to be for-profit corporations. During 2010, Health Care Service Corporation, the parent company of BCBS in Texas, Oklahoma, New Mexico, Montana and Illinois, nearly doubled its income to $1.09 billion in 2010, and began four years of billion-dollar profits. In the final spending bill for FY 2015 after much lobbying since 2010, nonprofit Blue Cross and Blue Shield plans continue to have special tax breaks that were understood to be threatened by the Affordable Care Act of 2010.

Current organization
Blue Cross and Blue Shield insurance companies are licensees, independent of the association and traditionally of each other, offering insurance plans within defined regions under one or both of the association's brands. Blue Cross Blue Shield insurers offer some form of health insurance coverage in every U.S. state. They also act as administrators
 of Medicare in many states or regions of the U.S.

The Blue Cross Blue Shield Federal Employee Program (FEP) is a nationwide option under the Federal Employees Health Benefits Program (FEHB) for U.S. federal government employees and retirees, and has been part of FEHB since FEHB's inception in 1960. FEP enrolls over half of the federal workforce, with over 5 million members, making it the largest insurer of federal employees and the largest single health plan group in the world.

The association is headquartered in the Michigan Plaza complex in the Chicago Loop area of Chicago, Illinois.

Member affiliated companies

Multi-state private companies
 CareFirst 
 District of Columbia
 Maryland
 Parts of Virginia (Alexandria City, Arlington County, Falls Church City, and parts of Fairfax County)
 Health Care Service Corporation
 BlueCross BlueShield of Illinois
 BlueCross BlueShield of Montana
 BlueCross BlueShield of New Mexico
 BlueCross BlueShield of Oklahoma
 BlueCross BlueShield of Texas
 Highmark
 Highmark BlueCross BlueShield (Western and Northeastern Pennsylvania)
 Highmark BlueShield (Eastern & Central Pennsylvania)
 Highmark Blue Cross Blue Shield Delaware (Delaware)
 Highmark BlueShield of Northeastern New York (New York) 
 Highmark BlueCross BlueShield West Virginia (formerly Mountain State Blue Cross Blue Shield) (West Virginia)
 Highmark BlueCross BlueShield of Western New York (New York)
 Premera
 Premera BlueCross BlueShield of Alaska
 Premera BlueCross (Washington)
 Cambia Health Solutions
 Regence BlueShield of Idaho
 Regence Blue Cross Blue Shield of Oregon
 Regence BlueCross BlueShield of Utah
 Regence BlueShield (Washington)
 Wellmark Blue Cross Blue Shield
 Iowa
 South Dakota

Publicly traded companies
 Anthem
 Anthem BlueCross and BlueShield
 Colorado
 Connecticut
 Georgia
 Indiana
 Kentucky
 Maine
 Missouri (excluding 30 counties in the Kansas City area)
 Nevada
 New Hampshire
 Ohio
 Virginia (excluding Alexandria City, Arlington County, Falls Church City, and parts of Fairfax County)
 Wisconsin
 Anthem Blue Cross (California)
 Blue Cross Blue Shield of Georgia
 Empire BlueCross BlueShield (New York)
 Triple-S Management Corporation (BlueCross & BlueShield Puerto Rico)

Companies outside of the United States
 BlueCross BlueShield of Costa Rica
 BlueCross BlueShield of Panama
 BlueCross BlueShield of Uruguay
 BlueCross of Canada

Regional member organizations
Single-state and regional member include the following organizations.

 BlueCross BlueShield of Alabama
 Blue Shield of California
 BlueCross BlueShield of Florida (branded as Florida Blue)
 Blue Cross and Blue Shield of Kansas City
 Blue Cross Blue Shield of Massachusetts
 Blue Cross Blue Shield of Michigan
 Blue Cross Blue Shield of North Dakota
 Blue Cross Blue Shield of South Carolina
 BlueCross BlueShield of Tennessee
 Capital Blue Cross (Central Pennsylvania)
 Capital Health Plan (Big Bend region of Florida)
 Florida Health Care Plans
 Hawaii Medical Service Association
 Horizon Blue Cross Blue Shield of New Jersey
 Independence Blue Cross (Philadelphia, Southeastern Pennsylvania)

Arizona
BlueCross BlueShield of Arizona (BCBSAZ) is a non-profit healthcare organization founded in 1939. BCBSAZ partners with non-profit "Discovery Triangle Development Corporation" to launch a Farm Express mobile market (formerly Fresh Express).

Arkansas
Founded in 1948, Arkansas BlueCross BlueShield (ABCBS)  is an independent licensee of the Blue Cross Blue Shield Association, and the largest healthcare provider in the state. It donated $1.98 million to The Walton College of Business toward founding its Robert L. Shoptaw Master of Healthcare Business Analytics Program. In August 2022, more than 12,000 members of Arkansas Blue Cross were affected by a ransomware attack on a former affiliate, North Highland Company, LLC.

Idaho
Blue Cross of Idaho and Regence BlueShield Idaho are separate companies and compete throughout the state. In 2019, Regence BlueShield Idaho announced a strategic alliance (not a merger) with Blue Cross North Carolina.

Kansas
Blue Cross and Blue Shield of Kansas (BCBSKS) was founded in 1942 by Sam Bartham, later becoming an independent licensee of the Blue Cross Blue Shield Association.

Louisiana
BlueCross BlueShield of Louisiana is a tax-paying non-profit that was founded in 1934 in New Orleans. An independent licensee of the BCBSA, it is a privately held mutual company without shareholders, which is wholly owned by its policyholders.

Minnesota
Blue Cross Blue Shield of Minnesota (BCBSMN) was founded in 1933, with 3,500 employees reported in 2022.

Mississippi
Blue Cross Blue Shield of Mississippi (BCBSMS) was formed as a privately held company in 1954. In 1948, it was converted to a non-profit. In 1973, its name was changed from Mississippi Hospital and Medical Service to Blue Cross & Blue Shield of Mississippi, Inc., which, in 1996, was converted from a non-profit membership corporation to a mutual insurance company, with the name again changed, to Blue Cross & Blue Shield of Mississippi, A Mutual Insurance Company. During 2022, BCBS and University of Mississippi Medical Center (UMMC) network entered conflict over who is to blame for an increasing lack of covered care in the state. Media reported that UMMC had paid close to $279,000 for digital advertising, commercials, and billboards to attack BCBS, which, in subsequent months, sued the hospital for defamation.

Nebraska
Blue Cross Blue Shield of Nebraska was founded in 1939. On July 1, 2018, BCBS Nebraska formed GoodLife Partners Inc., a mutual holding company, to conduct its noninsurance businesses. The company retained the Blue Cross brand, converting from mutual ownership to a stock company wholly owned by GoodLife.

New York
Excellus BlueCross BlueShield (Excellus BCBS, or Excellus) is a non-profit health insurance company headquartered in Rochester, New York.  It is part of the Blue Cross Blue Shield Association. Excellus BCBS is Upstate New York's largest nonprofit health plan.

In 2001, Excellus merged with Univera Healthcare, (formerly North AmeriCare), based in Buffalo. Univera retained its name and is separate from Excellus BCBS. Excellus was the target of a cyberattack in 2015, in which 10.5 million records were hacked, and cost the company 17.5 million dollars. The company's BlueCross BlueShield subsidiaries have been known as:
BlueCross BlueShield of Central New York
BlueCross BlueShield of the Rochester Area
BlueCross BlueShield of Utica-Watertown

North Carolina
By September 2010, BCBS licensee Blue Cross and Blue Shield of North Carolina announced that it would refund $156 million to their policyholders following documented charges: they had been sued and fined for denying due medical treatments to their customers and for underpaying doctors. As of 2019 they were overseeing well over half of all payments for medical services in their state. BCBSNC invests in chronic and underlying condition research, telehealth and artificial intelligence (AI) for digital healthcare.

In 2019, Blue Cross and Blue Shield of North Carolina agreed to enter into a partnership with Cambia Health, but cancelled the agreement later that year. Dr. Patrick H. Conway, who had served as CEO from 2017, was scheduled to become CEO of the merged company, replacing retiring Cambia CEO Mark Ganz, but resigned after a DWI arrest in June 2019, putting the merger on hold.

Pennsylvania
Though historically "Blue Cross" was used for hospital coverage while "Blue Shield" was used for medical coverage, today that split only exists for traditional health insurance plans in Pennsylvania. Two independent companies operate in central Pennsylvania, Highmark Blue Shield (Pittsburgh) and Capital Blue Cross (Central Pennsylvania). In southeastern Pennsylvania, Independence Blue Cross (Philadelphia) has a joint marketing agreement with Highmark Blue Shield (Pittsburgh) for their separate hospital and medical plans. However, Independence Blue Cross, like most of its sister Blue Cross  Blue Shield companies, cover most of their customers under managed care plans such as HMOs and PPOs which provide hospital and medical care in one policy.

Rhode Island
Blue Cross & Blue Shield of Rhode Island was founded in 1939. The insurer is headquartered in Providence, at the 13-storey, $114 million Smith Hill office tower that it had built during 2008 to 2009: Blue Cross & Blue Shield of Rhode Island Headquarters.

U.S. Virgin Islands
BlueCross BlueShield of the U.S. Virgin Islands is administered by Blue Cross Blue Shield of Puerto Rico.

Vermont
BlueCross BlueShield of Vermont was founded in 1980. In 2022, BCBS Vermont sued Teva Pharmaceuticals over its "years-long scheme to reap excessive profits" from sales of its multiple sclerosis (MS) drug, Copaxone.

Wyoming
BlueCross BlueShield of Wyoming (BCBSWY) is a non-profit founded in 1945. In 2022, BCBSWY penned opposition to the Pharmacy benefit managers act enhancements (Wyoming Senate File 0036).

Nonprofit status debate 
While only some members retain nonprofit status, the ones that do have been criticized for holding excessive amounts of cash or excessive executive compensation. For instance, the CEO of BCBS Michigan, Daniel Loepp, earned over 19 million USD in 2018, more than the CEO of Ford or Fiat Chrysler during the same year.

In 2014, BC/BS of Illinois (Health Care Service Corporation) was sued over its nonprofit status. The lawsuit was dismissed, with prejudice, and the dismissal ruling was upheld on appeal. Similar suits occurred with similar results in other states such as Oregon.

For-profit conversions 
Conversions into for-profit corporations typically results in distribution of some of the assets into a charitable foundation. When Blue Cross of California was converted, it initially had no distribution, but subsequently The California Endowment and California Health Care Foundation were endowed with $3.2 billion. Proceeds ranged from $3.2 billion (California) to $1.5 million (Nevada).

An exceptional case occurred in the Empire Blue Cross conversion, where the proceeds went to fund wage increases for union workers.

Antitrust settlement
In 2022, the group of 34 companies that make up the BCBS Association settled an antitrust investigation by allowing competition among member companies under non-Blue names while retaining regional exclusivity for regional licenses.

See also

 Blue Cross Canada

References

External links

 
"How Much Is Too Much? Consumersunion.org; July 2012.
"BCBSA History Fact Sheet" Blue Cross Blue Shield Association; March 1997.

 
1929 establishments in the United States
Companies based in Chicago
Financial services companies established in 1929
Health maintenance organizations
Insurance companies based in Illinois
Medical and health organizations based in Illinois
Organizations established in 1929
Supraorganizations